Ajene Griffith, better known as DJ Agile, is a Canadian hip-hop producer and DJ from Toronto, Ontario. He is a member of the hip-hop groups BrassMunk and Big Black Lincoln.

Biography
Agile began rapping in early high school, and after a talent show win, he knew music was his passion. One talent show turned into many and the wins spread citywide. Born with a West Indian hustle, he wanted to capitalize on his newfound fame and JLJ Productions (a DJ crew he started with his friends) was born.

While DJing independently and with his crew, by the end of high school, Agile began playing gigs with popular college/commercial radio stations across the city and soon fell in love with the element of production. He has since done production work for many artists including the likes of Nas, Kardinal Offishall, Melanie Fiona, Dwele, Jully Black, Glenn Lewis, Ivana Santilli, and Frank n Dank.

In 2009, Agile released the mixtape Toronto Love Jay, which was dedicated to the late producer J Dilla. It won the award for Mixtape of the Year at the 2009 Stylus DJ Awards.

From April 2010 - December 2015, Agile served as the Dean For Recording Arts at the Toronto Chapter of The Remix Project. Since 2009, Agile has served as a board member of the SOCAN Foundation He currently chairs the Pop Music Committees. Additionally, since January 2017 Agile sits on the Jazz Festival Advisory Committee.

In July 2022 Agile quarterbacked Drake's OVO Fest 'Canadian AllStars'. Not only did he open the show, but he DJ'd for most of the performing acts including special surprise guest Nelly Furtado.

DJ Agile has also had the honor of representing Canada in Ho Chi Minh City, Vietnam for the Smirnoff Nightlife Exchange Program, where he treated Vietnamese partygoers to an unforgettable Canadian-inspired nightlife experience. Agile continues to spin all over the globe, including stops in Canada, The United States, Hong Kong, Taiwan, Bermuda & the Virgin Islands.

Most recently, Agile produced the music for season three (2019) and season four (2020) of Netflix's Hip Hop Evolution.

Agile uses Serato Dj Pro, and traditional vinyl records to DJ.

For music production Agile uses Logic Pro X, Pro Tools, and Akai MPC 3000.

Discography

Awards, Nominations and Achievements

References

External links
 Official Website

Canadian people of Guyanese descent
Black Canadian musicians
Canadian hip hop DJs
Canadian hip hop record producers
Musicians from Toronto
Living people
Year of birth missing (living people)